Glendale Beeline is the municipal bus service operated by the city of Glendale, California, United States. It provides service in Glendale, as well as parts of the nearby La Crescenta-Montrose and La Cañada Flintridge. The service complements the Los Angeles County Metropolitan Transportation Authority's Metro Local routes along with Metro Express route 501, which connect Glendale to other parts of Los Angeles County.

Routes
Routes 11 and 12 operate under the "Metrolink Express" moniker and serve the Metrolink station at Glendale Transportation Center. Routes 33 and 34 operate under the "LCF Shuttle" moniker.

References

External links
Glendale Beeline website

Public transportation in the San Fernando Valley
Public transportation in Los Angeles County, California
Bus transportation in California
Transportation in the San Fernando Valley
Transportation in Glendale, California